Badnawar Assembly constituency is one of the 230 assembly constituencies of Madhya Pradesh a centre Indian state. Badnawar is also part of Dhar Lok Sabha constituency.

Members of Legislative Assembly
 1957: Manoharsingh Mehta, Indian National Congress
 1962: Govardhan, Jan Sangh
 1967: Govardhan, Jan Sangh
 1972: Chiranjilal Alawa, Indian National Congress
 1977: Goerdhan Sharma, Janata Party
 1980: Raghunath Singh, Indian National Congress (I)
 1985: Rameshchandrasingh Rathore, Bharatiya Janata Party
 1990: Prem Singh Daulat Singh, Indian National Congress
 1993: Rameshchandrasingh Rathore, Bharatiya Janata Party
 1998: Khemraj Patidar, Bharatiya Janata Party
 2003: Rajvardhan Singh Dattigaon, Indian National Congress
 2008: Rajvardhan Singh Dattigaon, Indian National Congress
 2013: Bhanwar Singh Shekhawat, Bharatiya Janata Party
 2018: Rajvardhan Singh Dattigaon, Indian National Congress

See also

 Badnawar
 Dhar district
 Dhar (Lok Sabha constituency)

References

Dhar district
Assembly constituencies of Madhya Pradesh